Indigo is a color between blue and violet.

Indigo or INDIGO may also refer to:

Companies
 IndiGo, a low-cost airline based in India
 Indigo (restaurant), a restaurant in Mumbai, India
 Canal Indigo, a pay-per-view TV network
 Hotel Indigo, a hotel chain
 Indigo Agriculture, a startup company that uses plant microbiomes to strengthen crops
 INDIGO Beijing, a shopping centre in China
 Indigo Books and Music (stylised !ndigo), a Canadian bookstore chain
 Indigo Internet, an internet service provider
 Indigo Park Services UK Limited, a parking company
 Indigo Partners, a private equity firm

Film
 Indigo (film), a 2003 film by Stephen Simon
 Indigo, a character in Rainbow Brite and the Star Stealer

Literature
 Indigo (Hoffman novel), a 2002 novel by Alice Hoffman
 Indigo (Warner novel), a 1992 novel by Marina Warner
 Indigo (comics), a DC Comics character
 Indigo Digital Press, a series of printing presses
 Indigo Publications, publishes websites and newsletters
 Indigo, a novel by Graham Joyce
 Indigo, series of fantasy novels by Louise Cooper
 Indigo, an imprint of Orion Publishing Group catering for the teen market

Music
Bands
 The Indigo, a Japanese band

Albums
 Indigo (Matt Bianco album), 1988
 Indigo (Chris Brown album), 2019
 Indigo (Diego Gonzalez album), 2008
 Indigo (Maja Keuc album), 2011
 Indigo (Never Shout Never album), 2012
 Indigo (RM album), 2022
 Indigo (Wild Nothing album), 2018
 Indigo: Women of Song, a 2004 album by Olivia Newton-John
 Indigo, a 1991 album by Patrick O'Hearn
 Indigo, a 2018 album by Kandace Springs

Songs
 "Indigo" (song), a 2018 song by Justhis, Kid Milli, Noel, and Yang Hong-won
 "Indigo", a 2007 song by Epica from The Divine Conspiracy
 "Indigo", a 1978 song by Peter Gabriel from Peter Gabriel
 "Indigo", a 2000 song by Moloko from Things to Make and Do
 "Indigo", a song by Niki from Head in the Clouds II
 Indigo (opera), a 2016 opera by Eicca Toppinen and Perttu Kivilaakso

Natural
 Indigo bush
 Indigo dye, an organic compound with a distinctive blue color
 Indigofera, a genus of flowering plants used to produce indigo dye
 Indigofera tinctoria, the species most often used in production of indigo dye
 Indigo snake Drymarchon, a genus of large nonvenomous snakes
 Wild indigo, a herbaceous perennial plant
 Indigo bunting, a small seed-eating bird in the cardinal family

Places
 Indigo Valley, Victoria, Australia
 Shire of Indigo, Victoria, Australia
 Indigo Lake, Alaska
 Indigo Tunnel, an abandoned railroad tunnel in Maryland
 Indigo Lake, Ohio

Radio stations
 Indigo 91.9 FM, an Indian radio station
 Indigo FM (Australia), an Australian radio station
 Indigo FM, a radio station broadcasting to the South Lakes and North Lancashire area in the United Kingdom

Technology
 Indigo (messaging system), part of the Windows .NET software framework
 Indigo (virtual assistant), an intelligent personal assistant for mobile devices
 Indian Initiative in Gravitational-wave Observations (INDIGO), a proposed gravitational wave detector
 Indigo Renderer, a 3D rendering engine
 Project Indigo, Indian/Swiss attempt to develop an intermediate-range surface-to-air missile
 SGI Indigo, a line of workstation computers
 Indigo, a postpaid cellular service by Mobilink in Pakistan
 Indigo, a release of Eclipse

Transport
 IndiGo, a low-cost Indian airline
 Indigo Airlines (American airline), a defunct airline
 Ford Indigo, a concept car by Ford Motor Company
 Indigo 3000, a Swedish roadster
 Tata Indigo, an Indian compact car

Other uses
 Indigo (actress) (born 1984), American television and voice actress
 Indigo (board game)
 Indiana County Transit Authority (IndiGO)
 Indigo children, a New Age concept, children who are believed to possess special traits or abilities
 Indigo Era, an economics theory

See also
 Captain Indigo, a character in the television series Captain Scarlet and the Mysterons
 Indiggo, a Romanian-American singing duo
 Indigo carmine, a pH indicator and food colorant
 Indigo Girls, American folk rock band
 Indigo Lake (disambiguation)
 Indigo revolt, a Bengali peasant movement
 Indigo Tribe, a fictional organization in DC Comics
 Indigo Walker, a character in the television series Home and Away
 Endigo, Swedish-Japanese drag queen